Montrae Rondrell Holland (born May 21, 1980) is a former American football offensive guard in the National Football League for the New Orleans Saints, Denver Broncos and Dallas Cowboys. He played college football at Florida State University.

Early years
Holland was born in Jefferson, Texas with a defect in his right leg which he had corrected in seventh grade. They had to break his leg and fuse his growth plates together on both legs which stunted his growth which made it so he could not grow anymore.

Holland attended Jefferson High School where he was an offensive guard in football and also practiced track.

He accepted a football scholarship from Florida State University. As a redshirt freshman, he was a backup at right guard. As a sophomore, he started all 13 games at right guard and did not allow a sack. He contributed to the team leading the nation in passing (384 yards per game) and scoring offense (42.4 points per game).

As a junior, he started every game at right guard, while allowing only two sacks. As a senior, he started the first 10 games at right guard.

He was a three-year starter and registered a streak of 29 consecutive starts at offensive guard. He received All-conference honors in every year he started for the school.

Professional career

New Orleans Saints
Holland was selected by the New Orleans Saints in the fourth round (102nd overall) of the 2003 NFL Draft. He appeared in all 16 games (7 starts) as a rookie. After playing the first nine games on special teams, he filled in at left guard for four games for an injured Kendyl Jacox, before switching to right guard to replace an injured LeCharles Bentley for the last two contests.

In 2004, he was named the full-time starter at right guard, missing three games with a torn ligament in his right knee, that he suffered in the eleventh game against the Atlanta Falcons. He contributed to Deuce McAllister third consecutive 1,000-yard season.

In 2005, he began the season as reserve for the first three games, before starting seven games at right guard in place of free agent-bust Jermane Mayberry and three games at left guard. In 2006, he was a backup at guard and was declared inactive in two playoff games.

Denver Broncos
On March 3, 2007, he signed as a free agent with the Denver Broncos. He passed Chris Kuper on the depth chart and started 16 games at right guard.

In 2008, he reported to training camp out of shape and lost his starter position to Kuper. On August 28, Holland was traded to the Dallas Cowboys in exchange for a fifth-round pick (#158-Matt Tennant) in the 2010 NFL Draft.

Dallas Cowboys
In 2008, the Dallas Cowboys acquired Holland because they needed depth in the offensive line after Kyle Kosier missed 13 games with a foot injury. He appeared in seven games (two starts)

In 2009, the Cowboys tried to convert him into a backup center, but because this was a new position to him, he was not effective. He was declared inactive for all 16 regular season games and in two playoff contests.

In 2010, he was mostly a reserve player, starting two games at left guard in place of an injured Kosier.

In 2011, he was released before the season started because he was out of shape. On October 18, he was re-signed after both Derrick Dockery and rookie Bill Nagy went down with injuries. He started 10 games at left guard and was a key player on the offensive line, before suffering a partially torn left biceps. On December 26, he was placed on the injured reserve list. In 2012, the Cowboys couldn't agree with Holland on a new contract and he decided instead not to play professional football.

Personal life
On June 24, 2008, he was presented by Mayor Bob Avery with the key to his hometown Jefferson, Texas, for his generous contributions over the years to the community, including his support of the Marion County Youth Football league.

References

1980 births
Living people
People from Jefferson, Texas
American football offensive guards
Florida State Seminoles football players
New Orleans Saints players
Denver Broncos players
Dallas Cowboys players
Players of American football from Texas